Puteri Indonesia 2020, the 24th Puteri Indonesia pageant, was held on 6 March 2020 at Jakarta Convention Center in Jakarta, Indonesia. Frederika Alexis Cull, Puteri Indonesia 2019, crowned her successor, Raden Roro Ayu Maulida Putri of East Java at the end of the event. She represented Indonesia at Miss Universe 2020, where she placed among the Top 20 finalists.

Jolene Marie Rotinsulu of North Sulawesi, Puteri Indonesia Lingkungan 2019, and Jesica Fitriana of West Java, Puteri Indonesia Pariwisata 2019, crowned their successors, Putu Ayu Saraswati of Bali and Jihane Almira Chedid of Central Java. Saraswati decided to not compete at Miss International 2022, while Chedid placed in the Top 12 Miss Supranational 2021.

The pageant featured the Jewel of Indonesia theme, as well as a series of Puteri Indonesia quarantine events held on the islands of Labuan Bajo and Komodo Island, both located in East Nusa Tenggara. Contestants from 39 provinces and territories participated.

The finale was attended by Miss Universe 2019, Zozibini Tunzi of South Africa; Miss International 2019, Sireethorn Leearamwat of Thailand; and Miss Supranational 2019, Anntonia Porsild of Thailand.

Results

Main

The Puteri Indonesia 2020 Titleholders
 Puteri Indonesia 2020 (Miss Universe Indonesia 2020) 
 Puteri Indonesia Lingkungan 2020
 Puteri Indonesia Pariwisata 2020 (Miss Supranational Indonesia 2021)

§ Voted into the Top 11 by Social medias and Fan-voting

Special Award

Puteri Indonesia Kepulauan
Puteri Indonesia Kepulauan is a title for the most favorite contestant chosen through votes from each island group:

Selection Committee 
There were ten selection committee members:
 Kusuma Dewi Sutanto – Jury President, Puteri Indonesia Foundation Head of Education
 Mega Angkasa – Jury Secretary, Mustika Ratu Head of Communication and Public Relation of Puteri Indonesia
 Kusuma Ida Anjani – Puteri Indonesia Head of Organizing Committee
 Sonia Fergina Citra – Puteri Indonesia 2018 and Miss Universe 2018 Top 20 from Bangka Belitung
 Pia Wurtzbach – Miss Universe 2015 from Philippines
 Wishnutama – Minister of Tourism and Creative Economy of the Republic of Indonesia
 Erick Thohir – Minister of State Owned Enterprises of the Republic of Indonesia
 Bambang Soesatyo – Chairperson of the People's Representative Council of the Republic of Indonesia
 I Gusti Ayu Bintang Darmawati – Minister of Women Empowerment and Child Protection of the Republic of Indonesia
 Triawan Munaf – chairman of the board of Commissioner in Garuda Indonesia

Contestants 
39 delegates participated in the competition.

Crossovers Notes
Contestants who previously competed in other local and/or international beauty pageants and reality modeling competitions:

References

2020

Puteri Indonesia
2020 in Indonesia
Beauty pageants in Indonesia